Siluan Mrakić (born September 17, 1979) is a Serbian Orthodox bishop serving as the Bishop of Australia and New Zealand since August 2016.

Early life and education
He was born on September 17, 1979 in Sydney, Australia to parents father Veljko and mother Janja (née Vukanović). He was baptized the same year in the Saint Nicholas Serbian Orthodox Church in Blacktown, Sydney. His family hails from Herzegovina, from the Zavala hamlet of Budim Do, Trebinje district.

He finished elementary school at Parramatta Primary School and secondary school at Arthur Phillip High School. He enrolled in the Theological Seminary of St. Peter of Cetinje in 1995. After graduating from the seminary in 2003, he enrolled in the University of Belgrade Faculty of Orthodox Theology where he graduated in 2005. After graduating, he returned to Australia where he became a novice at the Saint Sava Novi Kalenić monastery. In that capacity, in 2006, he went to the newly established Diocese of Valjevo. Shortly afterwards, he continued his theological training in Russia by enrolling in the Moscow Theological Academy in the Trinity Lavra of St. Sergius in Sergiyev Posad.

After graduating from the Moscow Theological Academy in 2009, he continued his scientific training there by writing a candidate's dissertation on the topic of Anthropology of the Venerable Justin Popović. He successfully defended his dissertation at the end of 2010, and by defending his work he received the high theological-scientific title of the Russian Orthodox Church – candidate of theology. He was ordained a monk by Bishop Milutin (Knežević) of Valjevo in the rank of Little Schema, on December 18, 2010, on the day of Saint Sava the Consecrated in the Pustinja monastery. The next day, next to the relics of Saint Nikolaj of Serbia in Lelić, he was ordained to the rank of hierodeacon. In 2012, he enrolled in master's studies at the Greek Theological Faculty of St. Andrew the First Called under the jurisdiction of the Ecumenical Patriarchate in his hometown of Sydney. After completing his studies, he was ordained to the rank of hieromonk, and in the same year he received the title of protosyncellus.

As bishop
At the end of 2015, Bishop Milutin of Valjevo appointed Father Siluan as the archbishop's deputy. In that capacity, he was elected bishop of the Metropolitanate of Australia and New Zealand at the regular May session of the Holy Assembly of Bishops, on May 26, 2016. The former Bishop of Australia and New Zealand Irinej (Dobrijević) was elected Bishop of Eastern America.

He was ordained a bishop in the St. Michael's Cathedral in Belgrade on August 7, 2016. The reading of the nomination homily was performed the day before.

References

1979 births
Living people
Clergy from Sydney
Australian people of Serbian descent
Bishops of the Serbian Orthodox Church
University of Belgrade Faculty of Orthodox Theology alumni